The 2012 Judo sGrand Prix Abu Dhabi was held in Abu Dhabi, United Arab Emirates from 11 to 13 October 2012.

Medal summary

Men's events

Women's events

Source Results

Medal table

References

External links
 

2012 IJF World Tour
2012 Judo Grand Prix
Judo
Grand Prix Abu Dhabi 2012
Judo
Judo